Hubert Contout is a French Guianan professional football manager.

Career
Since 2012 until 2013 he coached the French Guiana national football team together with François Louis-Marie.

References

Place of birth missing (living people)
Living people
French football managers
French Guianan football managers
French Guiana national football team managers
Year of birth missing (living people)